Hector H. Crowther was an English professional rugby league footballer who played in the 1920s and 1930s.

Playing career

International honours
Hector Crowther a won cap for England while at Hunslet in 1930 against Other Nationalities, and a won cap for England while at Hunslet in 1930 against Australia.

County Cup Final appearances
Hector Crowther played left-, i.e. number 11, in the Hunslet FC's 7-13 defeat by Hull Kingston Rovers in the 1929–30 Yorkshire County Cup Final during the 1929–30 season at Headingley Rugby Stadium, Leeds on Saturday 30 November 1929, in front of a crowd of 11,000.

References

External links

English rugby league players
England national rugby league team players
Great Britain national rugby league team players
Hunslet F.C. (1883) players
Place of birth missing
Place of death missing
Rugby league second-rows
Year of birth missing
Year of death missing
Yorkshire rugby league team players